Yumen may refer to:

Yumen Pass, pass of the Great Wall of China
Yumen City, country-level city in Jiuquan, Gansu, China, named after the pass
Yumen Town, Yumen, a town in Yumen City
Yumen, Sichuan (渔门), a town in Yanbian County, Sichuan, China